Jean-Claude Pagal (born September 15, 1964 in Yaoundé, Cameroon) is a former Cameroonian footballer.

Career statistics

International goals

References

External links
 
 Profile

1964 births
Living people
Footballers from Yaoundé
Cameroonian footballers
Cameroon international footballers
Cameroonian expatriate footballers
Expatriate footballers in China
Expatriate footballers in England
Expatriate footballers in France
Expatriate footballers in Malta
Expatriate footballers in Mexico
Cameroonian expatriate sportspeople in China
Cameroonian expatriate sportspeople in England
Cameroonian expatriate sportspeople in France
Cameroonian expatriate sportspeople in Malta
Cameroonian expatriate sportspeople in Mexico
RC Lens players
La Roche VF players
AS Saint-Étienne players
FC Martigues players
Ligue 1 players
Club América footballers
Liga MX players
Carlisle United F.C. players
1990 FIFA World Cup players
1990 African Cup of Nations players
1992 African Cup of Nations players
Association football midfielders